The conventional method to evaluate the resolution of a tomography reconstruction is determined by the Crowther criterion.

The minimum number of views, m, to reconstruct a particle of diameter D to a resolution of d (=1/R) is given by

References

Condensed matter physics
Electron microscopy
Medical imaging
Geometric measurement
X-ray computed tomography
Multidimensional signal processing